St. Anthony Channel is a strait connecting Šibenik Bay to the Adriatic Sea. It was protected as a significant landscape in 1974. It is more than 2000 metres long and between 140 and 220 metres wide. It has become popular since walking trail was built alongside channel. The place is perfect for a variety of activities such as biking, walking, swimming and sightseeing. The most beautiful attractions of the channel include St. Nicholas' Fortress, located at the entrance of the channel, St. Anthony Cave, located in the middle of the channel and the nearby "Hitler's Eyes" bunker.
There is a viewpoint with panoramic view of Šibenik near the cave.

Image gallery

References 

Šibenik
Buildings and structures in Šibenik-Knin County